Limapuluh is a town in North Sumatra province of Indonesia and it is the seat (capital) of Batubara Regency.

Climate
Lima Puluh has a tropical rainforest climate (Af) with heavy to very heavy rainfall year-round.

References

Populated places in North Sumatra
Regency seats of North Sumatra